Martino Martini (20 September 1614 – 6 June 1661), born and raised in Trento (Prince-Bishopric of the Holy Roman Empire), was a Jesuit missionary. As cartographer and historian, he mainly worked on ancient Imperial China.

Early years

Martini was born in Trento, in the Bishopric of Trent, Holy Roman Empire. After finishing high school in Trento in 1631, he joined the Society of Jesus, continuing his studies of classical literature and philosophy at the Roman College in Rome (1634–1637). However, his main interest was astronomy and mathematics, which he studied under the supervision of Athanasius Kircher. His request to undertake missionary work in China was eventually approved by Mutius Vitelleschi, the then Superior General of the Jesuits. He pursued his theological studies in Portugal (1637–1639) on his way to China, where he was ordained priest (1639, in Lisbon).

In the Chinese Empire
He set out for China in 1640 and arrived in Portuguese Macau in 1642 where he studied Chinese for some time. In 1643 he crossed the border and settled in Hangzhou, Zhejiang Province, from where he did much travelling in order to gather scientific information, especially on the geography of the Chinese empire: he visited several provinces, as well as Peking and the Great Wall. He made great use of his talents as missionary, scholar, writer and superior.

Soon after Martini's arrival to China, the Ming capital Beijing fell to Li Zicheng's rebels (April 1644) and then to the Qing dynasty, and the last legitimate Ming emperor, the Chongzhen Emperor, hanged himself. Down in Zhenjiang, Martini continued working with the short-lived regime of Zhu Yujian, Prince of Tang, who set himself up as the (Southern) Ming Longwu Emperor. Soon enough, the Qing troops reached Zhejiang. According to Martini's report (which appeared in some editions of his De bello tartarico), the Jesuit was able to switch his allegiance to China's new masters in an easy but bold, way. When Wenzhou, in southern Zhejiang, where Martini happened to be on a mission for Zhu Yujian, was besieged by the Qing and was about to fall, the Jesuit decorated the house where he was staying with a large red poster with seven characters saying, "Here lives a doctor of the divine Law who has come from the Great West". Under the poster he set up tables with European books, astronomical instruments, etc., surrounding an altar with an image of Jesus. When the Qing troops arrived, their commander was sufficiently impressed with the display to approach Martini politely and ask if he wished to switch his loyalty to the new Qing Dynasty. Martini agreed and had his head shaved in the Manchu way, and his Chinese dress and hat were replaced with Qing-style ones. The Qing then allowed him to return to his Hangzhou church and provided him and the Hangzhou Christian community with the necessary protection.

The Chinese Rites affair

In 1651 Martini left China for Rome as the Delegate of the Chinese Mission Superior. He took advantage of the long, adventurous voyage (going first to the Philippines, from thence on a Dutch privateer to Bergen, Norway, which he reached on 31 August 1653, and then to Amsterdam). Further, and still on his way to Rome, he met printers in Antwerp, Vienna and Munich to submit to them historical and cartographic data he had prepared. The works were printed and made him famous.

When passing through Leyden, Martini was met by Jacobus Golius, a scholar of Arabic and Persian at the university there. Golius did not know Chinese, but had read about "Cathay" in Persian books, and wanted to verify the truth of the earlier reports of Jesuits such as Matteo Ricci and Bento de Góis who believed that Cathay was the same place as China, where they lived or, visited. Golius was familiar with the discussion of the "Cathayan" calendar in Zij-i Ilkhani, a work by the Persian astronomer Nasir al-Din al-Tusi, completed in 1272. When Golius met Martini (who, of course, knew no Persian), the two scholars found that the names of the 12 divisions into which, according to Nasir al-Din, the "Cathayans" were dividing the day, as well as those of the 24 sections of the year reported by Nasir al-Din matched those that Martini had learned in China. The story, soon published by Martini in the "Additamentum" to his Atlas of China, seemed to have finally convinced most European scholars that China and Cathay were the same.

On his way to Rome, Martini met his then 10-year-old cousin Eusebio Kino who later became another famed Jesuit missionary explorer and the world-renowned cartographer of New Spain.

In the spring of 1655 Martini reached Rome. There, in Rome, was the most difficult part of his journey.  He had brought along (for the Holy Office of the Church) a long and detailed communication from the Jesuit missionaries in China, in defence of their inculturated missionary and religious approach: the so-called Chinese Rites (Veneration of ancestors, and other practices allowed to new Christians). Discussions and debates took place for five months, at the end of which the Propaganda Fide issued a decree in favour of the Jesuits (23 March 1656). A battle was won, but the controversy did not abate.

Return to China

In 1658, after a most difficult journey, he was back in China with the favourable decree. He was again involved in pastoral and missionary activities in the Hangzhou area where he built a three naves church that was considered to be one of the most beautiful in the country (1659–1661). The church was hardly built when he died of cholera (1661). David E. Mungello wrote that he died of rhubarb overdosing which aggravated his constipation.

Travels
Martini travelled in at least fifteen countries in Europe and seven provinces of the Chinese empire, making stops in India, Java, Sumatra, the Philippines and South Africa. After studying in Trento and Rome, Martini reached Genoa, Alicante, Cádiz, Sanlucar de Barrameda (a port near to Seville in Spain), Seville, Evora and Lisbon (Portugal), Goa (in the western region of India), Surat (a port in the northwestern region of India), Macao (on the China's southern coast, administrated by the Portuguese), Guangzhou (the capital of Guangdong Province), Nanxiong (in northern Guangdong province, between the mountains), Nanchang (the capital of Jiangxi Province), Jiujiang (in northwest Jiangxi Province), Nanjing, Hangzhou (the capital of Zhejiang Province) and Shanghai.

Traversing the Shandong Province he reached Tianjin and Beijing, Nanping in the Fujian Province, Wenzhou (in southern Zhejiang Province), Anhai (a port in southern Fujian), Manila (in the Philippines), Makassar (Sulawesi island in the Dutch Indonesia), Batavia/Jakarta (Sumatra island, capital of the Dutch Indonesia), Cape Town/Kaapstad (a stop of twenty days in the fort, the Dutch Governor Jan van Riebeeck had built in 1652), Bergen, Hamburg, the Belgian Antwerp and Brussels where he met the archduke Leopold Wilhelm of Austria, the Dutch Leiden (with the scholar Jacobus Golius) and Amsterdam, where he met the famous cartographer Joan Blaeu.

He reached almost certainly some cities in France, then Monaco di Baviera, Vienna and the nearby  (where he met the Holy Roman Emperor Ferdinand III of Habsburg), and finally Rome. For his last journey (from 11 January 1656 to 17 July 1658) Martini sailed from Genoa, the Hyeres islands on the French Riviera (to escape pirates), to Alicante, Lisboa, Goa, the Portuguese colony of Larantuka in Flores Island (Indonesia) resting over a month, Makassar (where he met a Dominican friar, Domingo Navarrete), Macao, and finally Hangzhou, where he died.

Post-mortem phenomenon

According to the attestation of Prosper Intorcetta (in Litt. Annuae, 1861), Martini's corpse was found to be undecayed after twenty years. It became a longstanding object of cult, not only for Christians, until, in 1877, suspecting idolatry, the hierarchy had it reburied.

Modern views
Today's scientists have shown increasing interest in the works of Martini.  During an international convention organized in the city of Trento (his birthplace), a member of the Chinese academy of Social Sciences, Prof. Ma Yong said:  "Martini was the first to study the history and geography of China with rigorous scientific objectivity; the extent of his knowledge of the Chinese culture, the accuracy of his investigations, the depth of his understanding of things Chinese are examples for the modern sinologists". Ferdinand von Richthofen calls Martini "the leading geographer of the Chinese mission, one who was unexcelled and hardly equalled, during the XVIII century … There was no other missionary, either before or after, who made such diligent use of his time in acquiring information about the country". (China, I, 674 sq.)

Martino Martini in popular culture 
In the television series How I Met Your Mother (series 8 episode 24 titled "Something New"), as Robin and Barney converse, two maps from Martino Martini's Atlas are seen hanging in brown frames on the walls of a posh restaurant in New York City: to be precise, the top one represents Beijing province and the bottom one Fujian.

Works

Martini's most important work is Novus Atlas Sinensis, which appeared as part of volume 10 of Joan Blaeu's Atlas Maior (Amsterdam 1655). This work, a folio with 17 maps and 171 pages of text was, in the words of the early 20th-century German geographer Ferdinand von Richthofen, the most complete geographical description of China that we possess, and through which Martini has become the father of geographical learning on China. The French Jesuits of the time concurred, saying that even du Halde's monumental Description…de la Chine did not fully supersede Martini's work. The maps were reprinted in the 1659 Geographica Blaviana and the 1690 Atlas van der Hagen.
Of the great chronological work which Martini had planned, and which was to comprise the whole Chinese history from the earliest age, only the first part appeared: Sinicæ Historiæ Decas Prima (Munich 1658), which reached until the birth of Jesus.
His De Bello Tartarico Historia (Antwerp 1654) is also important as Chinese history, for Martini himself had lived through the frightful occurrences which brought about the overthrow of the ancient Ming dynasty. The works have been repeatedly published and translated into different languages. There is also a later version, entitled Regni Sinensis a Tartaris devastati enarratio (1661); compared to the original De Bello Tartarica Historia, it has some additions, such as an index.
Interesting as missionary history is his Brevis Relatio de Numero et Qualitate Christianorum apud Sinas, (Brussels, 1654).
Besides these, Martini wrote a series of theological and apologetical works in Chinese, including a De Amicitia (Hangzhou, 1661) that could have been the first anthology of Western authors available in China (Martini's selection drew mainly from Roman and Greek writings).
Grammatica Linguae Sinensis (1652–1653). The first manuscript grammar of Mandarin Chinese and the first grammar of the Chinese language ever printed and published in M. Thévenot Relations des divers voyages curieux (1696)
Several works, among them a Chinese translation of the works of Francisco Suarez, which has not been found yet.

See also

Hangzhou
Immaculate Conception Cathedral of Hangzhou
Vicariate Apostolic of Kiang-nan
Religion in China
Christianity in China
Jesuit China missions

References

Further reading

Bertuccioli, Giuliano (1998). "Martino Martini, Opera Omnia, vol. I – Lettere e documenti". Trento, Università degli Studi di Trento
Bertuccioli, Giuliano (1998). "Martino Martini, Opera Omnia, vol. II – Opere minori". Trento, Università degli Studi di Trento
Bertuccioli, Giuliano (2002). "Martino Martini, Opera Omnia, vol. III – Novus Atlas Sinensis (1655)"
Masini, Federico; Paternicò, Luisa M. (2010). "Martino Martini, Opera Omnia, vol. IV –  Sinicae Historiae Decas Prima. Trento
Masini, Federico; Paternicò, Luisa M.; Antonucci, Davor (2014). "Martino Martini, Opera Omnia, vol. V – De Bello Tartarico Historia e altri scritti". Trento, 2014.
Bolognani, B. (1978). "L'Europa scopre il volto della Cina; Prima biografia di Padre Martino Martini". Trento
Various authors, "Martino Martini geografo, cartografo, storico, teologo" (Trento 1614-Hangzhou 1661, atti del Convegno Internazionale, Trento 1983.
Baldacci, Osvaldo, "Validità cartografica e fortuna dell'Atlas Sinensis di Martino Martini", Trento, 1983
Demarchi, F. and Scartezzini, R. (eds), "M. Martini – a Humanist and Scientist in XVIIth century China", Trento, 1996
Quaini, Massimo and Castelnovi, Michele, "Visioni del Celeste Impero. L’immagine della Cina nella cartografia occidentale", Genova, Il Portolano, 2007 (English: Massimo Quaini e Michele Castelnovi, Visions of the celestial empire. China's image in western cartography, Genova, Il Portolano, 2007). translated 《天朝大国的景象——西方地图中的中国》 [Visions of the Celestial Empire: western maps of China], 本书由意大利学者曼斯缪·奎尼 （The book by the Italian scholar Massimo Quaini） e 和他的学生米歇尔·卡斯特诺威（ and his student Michele Castelnovi), Shanghai, 范大学出版社 (ECNU - East China Normal University Press) – authorized translation allowed by Centro Martini di Trento, 2015. 
Masini, Federico, Martino Martini, in Dizionario Biografico degli Italiani, vol. 71, Roma, IPZS, 2008, pp. 244–246.
Various authors, Riflessi d'Oriente. L'immagine della Cina nella cartografia europea, Mostra 18/12/08-18/02/09, a cura di Aldo Caterino, Genova, Il Portolano (Centro Studi Martino Martini di Trento), 2008.
Longo, Giuseppe O., Il Mandarino di Dio. Un gesuita nel Celeste Impero. Dramma in tre scene, Trento, Centro Studi M. Martini, 2008.
Longo, Giuseppe O., Il gesuita che disegnò la Cina. La vita e le opere di Martino Martini, Milano, Springer, 2010.
Masini, Federico, "Martino Martini: China in Europe", in Paternicò Luisa M. (editor), The Generation of Giants. Jesuit Missionaries and Scientists in China on the Footsteps of Matteo Ricci, "Sulla via del Catai", n. 11, Trento: Centro Studi Martini, 2011, pp. 39–44 (Italian version: Masini, Federico, Martino Martini: la Cina in Europa, in Paternicò, Luisa M. (a cura di), La Generazione dei Giganti, Gesuiti scienziati e missionari in Cina sulle orme di Matteo Ricci, numero monografico di "Sulla via del Catai", anno V, numero 6, Genova, Il Portolano, 2011, pp. 70–82.
Castelnovi, Michele, Il primo atlante dell’Impero di Mezzo. Il contributo di Martino Martini alla conoscenza geografica della Cina, Trento, Centro Studi Martino Martini per le relazioni culturali Europa-Cina, 2012.  .
Paternicò, Luisa M. (2013). When the Europeans Began to Study Chinese, Leuven Chinese Studies XXIV, Leuven: Ferdinand Verbiest Institute, KU Leuven, 2013, 
Castelnovi, Michele, Perché stampare un Atlante, in Scartezzini Riccardo (a cura di), Martino Martini Novus Atlas Sinensis: le mappe dell’atlante commentate, Trento, Università degli Studi di Trento, 2014, pp. 37–39. .
Castelnovi Michele, La Cina come sogno e come incubo per gli occidentali, in "Sulla Via del Catai", Trento, anno VII, numero 9, maggio 2014 (numero monografico "La Cina come sogno e come incubo. Uno sguardo sull’immaginario onirico occidentale" a cura di M. Castelnovi), pp. 11–27.
Castelnovi Michele, Monti e fiumi della Cina secondo Martino Martini, in Approcci geo-storici e governo del territorio. 2: Scenari nazionale e internazionali (a cura di Elena Dai Prà), Milano, Franco Angeli, 2014, pp. 274–283.
Castelnovi Michele, Il cibo nell’Impero cinese secondo l’Atlante di Martino Martini, in Alimentazione, Ambiente, Società e Territorio: per uno sviluppo sostenibile e responsabile. Contributi e riflessioni geografiche a partire dai temi di Expo Milano 2015, a cura di Alessandro Leto, supplemento al numero 2 di "Ambiente, Società e Territorio", Roma, giugno 2015, pp. 69–72, 
Paternicò, Luisa M.; von COLLANI, Claudia, Scartezzini Riccardo (editors), Martino Martini Man of Dialogue, Proceedings of the International Conference held in Trento on October 15–17, 2014 for the 400th anniversary of Martini's birth, Università degli Studi di Trento (con il contributo del DAAD e della Regione Autonoma Trentino-Alto Adige/Sudtirol), 2016. Contiene: Preface of the editors, pp. 7–9; GOLVERS, Noel, Note on the Newly Discovered Portrait of Martini, 1654, by Flemish painter Michaelina Wautier (1617-1689), pp. 9–12; MASINI, Federico, Introduction, pp. 13–18; SCARTEZZINI, Riccardo e CATTANI, Piergiorgio, Il secolo dei gesuiti a Trento: Martini e la città del Concilio tra mondo italiano e germanico, pp. 19–44.
LENTINI, Orlando, Da Martino Martini a Zhang Weiwei, pp. 45–64; Von COLLANI, Claudia, Two Astronomers: Martino Martini and Johann Adam Schall von Bell, pp. 65–94; RUSSO, Mariagrazia, Martino Martini e le lettere portoghesi: tasselli per un percorso biografico, pp. 95–112; GOLVERS, Noel, Martino Martini in the Low Countries, pp. 113–136; LINDGREN Uta, Martini, Nieuhof und die Vereinigte Ostindische Compagnie der Niederländer, pp. 137–158; PIASTRA, Stefano, Francesco Brancati, Martino Martini and Shanghai's Lao Tang (Old Church): Mapping, Perception and Cultural Implications of a Place, pp. 159–181. WIDMAIER, Rita, Modallogik versus Probabilitätslogik: Logik der Tatsachenwahrheit bei G. W. Leibniz und Martino Martini bei den virulenten Fragen im Ritenstreit, pp. 183–198; CRIVELLER, Gianni, Martino Martini e la controversia dei riti cinesi, pp. 199–222; MORALI, Ilaria, Aspetti teologici della controversia sui riti e loro attualità a 50 anni dal Concilio Vaticano II: contributo ad una Teologia delle Religioni autenticamente cattolica, pp. 223–250; ANTONUCCI, Davor, Scritti inediti di Martino Martini: ipotesi di lavoro e di ricerca, pp. 251–284; PATERNICÒ, Luisa M., The Manuscript of the Sinicae Historiae Decas Prima in the Vatican Library, pp. 285–298; Castelnovi, Michele, Da Il Libro delle Meraviglie al Novus Atlas Sinensis, una rivoluzione epistemologica: Martino Martini sostituisce Marco Polo, pp. 299–336; BERGER, Katrien, Martino Martini De Bello Tartarico: a comparative study of Latin text and his translations, pp. 337–362; YUAN XI, Una ricerca terminologica sull’opera teologica martiniana Zhenzhu lingxing lizheng, pp. 363–388.

DAI PRÀ, Elena (a cura di), La storia della cartografia e Martino Martini, Milano, Franco Angeli (collana: "Scienze geografiche"), 2015 – .  contiene: MASETTI, Carla, Presentazione, pp. 7–8; DAI PRÀ, Elena, Le opere di Martino Martini: momento e fattore di svolta nella cultura occidentale, pp. 9–14; SURDICH, Francesco, La "Flora Sinensis" e la "Clavis Medica" di Michael Boym, pp. 15–24; CONTI, Simonetta, Il lungo cammino della Cartografia. Dal Paradiso Terrestre alla realtà del lontano Oriente (secc. VII-XV), pp. 25–46; D’ASCENZO, Annalisa, I geografi italiani e la costruzione dell’immagine dell’Asia orientale fra tardo Quattrocento e Cinquecento, pp. 47–67; CARIOTI, Patrizia, La Cina al tempo di Martino Martini. Alcune riflessioni, pp. 68–90; Castelnovi Michele, Ultra Atlantem: l’interesse storicogeografico delle «altre» opere di Martino Martini, pp. 91–140; HUIZONG LU, Giulio Aleni e la visione cinese dell’universo, pp. 141–160; DUMBRAVĂ, Daniela, Il «Novus Atlas Sinensis» di Martino Martini versus l’«Opisanie Kitay» di Nicolae Milescu?, pp. 161–176; RICCI, Alessandro, Geografia, politica e commerci globali: Martino Martini e la cartografia olandese del Secolo d’Oro, pp. 177–193; ROSSI, Luisa, "La vision de l’amateur de cartes". François de Dainville, gesuita, storico della cartografia, pp. 194–205; ROSSI, Massimo, Un atlante cinese per un pubblico europeo. I segni convenzionali nell’Atlas Sinensis del 1655 di Martino Martini, pp. 206–219; DAI PRÀ, Elena e MASTRONUNZIO, Marco, La misura dell’impero. Mappe napoleoniche per i confini della Mitteleuropa, pp. 220–232.
Castelnovi Michele, From the Polo's Marvels To the Nieuhof's Falsiability, in "Documenti geografici – nuova serie" a cura di Alessandro Ricci, numero 1, Roma, gennaio-giugno 2016, pp. 55–101. 

1614 births
1661 deaths
People from Trento
20th-century Italian historians
Italian Roman Catholic missionaries
Italian orientalists
17th-century Italian Jesuits
Deaths from cholera
17th-century Italian cartographers
Jesuit missionaries in China
Italian emigrants to China
17th-century Italian translators
Italian sinologists